Elections to local municipal councils were held across Venezuela on May 9, 1948, except for the Federal District and the Federal Territories were local authorities had been elected in December 1947. These were the first municipal elections with direct universal and secret suffrage held separately from the national presidential or legislative elections.

Participation declined compared with the presidential and legislative elections the previous year. As it was the third election in two years, there was considerable voter fatigue. In total 693,154 people cast their votes.

The elections resulted in an overwhelming victory for the Democratic Action party, following the pattern of the 1946-1947 elections. COPEI won the election in the Táchira state and its local affiliate the Republican Federal Union won the polls in the Mérida state. Most of the COPEI votes came from these two states, where the party won majorities in almost all of the municipal councils. The Communist Party gained representation in councils in the Federal District, Anzoátegui, Lara and Zulia. The Revolutionary Party of the Proletariat, the so-called 'Black Communists', won a seat in Anzoátegui.

Results

National summary

"Others" obtained 2 seats in total.

State-wise distribution of seats

References

2013
Venezuela
1948 in Venezuela